Constantinople Records was an upstart record label created by Billy Corgan of The Smashing Pumpkins.  Little is known about the label and no official website or company exists.  The US Patent Office's website listed the label as being trademarked by Corgan.  When word of the label was made public, a domain name was registered but no website ever appeared.  After one year the URL had expired.

The label was ultimately created to only release The Smashing Pumpkins' sixth studio album: Machina II/The Friends & Enemies of Modern Music and the EPs that were associated with it, because Corgan's relationship with Virgin Records had deteriorated. Virgin had refused to release Machina and Machina II as a double album, and when Machina sold poorly, refused entirely to release the sequel. Since the band was breaking up at the time, Corgan decided to release Machina II for free download on the internet. Only twenty-five vinyl copies were pressed, and were shipped via FedEx to several prominent fans in the online community, with instructions to immediately redistribute it on the Internet free of charge.

Releases

Five releases have come out on Constantinople Records:

CR-01: The first EP in Machina II/The Friends & Enemies of Modern Music 
CR-02: The second EP in Machina II
CR-03: The third EP in Machina II
CR-04: The double LP in Machina II
CR-05: Live at Cabaret Metro 10-5-88
It was rumored that this label would support all future releases for work done by Billy Corgan.  However, starting in 2003 he began publishing work under the label "Martha's Music," with distribution by Reprise Records.

References 

 E! Online News- Smashing Pumpkins' Swan Songs, September 12, 2000

See also
List of record labels

American record labels
Record labels established in 2000
Alternative rock record labels